Kalininsk is the name of several inhabited localities in Russia.

Urban localities
Kalininsk, Saratov Oblast, a town in Kalininsky District of Saratov Oblast

Rural localities
Kalininsk, Tomsk Oblast, a settlement under the administrative jurisdiction of the town of Kedrovy, Tomsk Oblast